Don't Bet on Love is a 1933 American comedy film directed by Murray Roth and written by Howard Emmett Rogers, Murray Roth and Ben Ryan. The film stars Lew Ayres, Ginger Rogers, Charley Grapewin, Shirley Grey, Tom Dugan and Merna Kennedy. The film was released on July 1, 1933, by Universal Pictures.

Plot
Molly Gilbert won't accept a marriage proposal from Bill McCaffery unless he promises to quit betting money on horse races. He gives her his word, but Molly is miffed when she realizes he wants to honeymoon in Saratoga, New York, due to its proximity to the racetrack.

Behind her back, Bill unethically uses money from his dad Pop McCaffery's plumbing business to continue gambling. He gets on a hot streak, winning $50,000, then buys a horse of his own, cheats by disguising a faster horse as his, then loses all his money. Bill agrees to become a plumber, pleasing Molly.

Cast 
Lew Ayres as Bill McCaffery
Ginger Rogers as Molly Gilbert
Charley Grapewin as Pop McCaffery
Shirley Grey as Goldie Williams
Tom Dugan as Scotty
Merna Kennedy as Ruby 'Babe' Norton
Lucile Gleason as Mrs. Gilbert
Robert Emmett O'Connor as Edward Shelton

References

External links 
 

1933 films
American comedy films
1933 comedy films
Universal Pictures films
American black-and-white films
Films directed by Murray Roth
1930s English-language films
1930s American films